Afrotrilepis is a genus of flowering plants belonging to the family Cyperaceae.

Its native range is Western and Western Central Tropical Africa.

Species:

Afrotrilepis jaegeri 
Afrotrilepis pilosa

References

Cyperaceae
Cyperaceae genera
Taxa named by Charles Louis Gilly